The 2021–22 season of the Frauen-Bundesliga was the 32nd season of Germany's premier women's football league. It ran from 27 August 2021 to 15 May 2022.

The fixtures were announced on 6 July 2021.

Teams

Team changes

Stadiums

League table

Results

Top scorers

Notes

References

External links
DFB.de

2021–22
2021–22 in German women's football leagues